The Sidney Historic Business District is a historic district that was listed on the National Register of Historic Places in 1994.

It is a  area roughly bounded by Hickory and King Sts. and 9th and 11th Aves. in Sidney, Nebraska.  It includes 29 contributing buildings.

It was deemed significant "in the area of commerce": "The district
conveys a strong association with commercial activities that began with the arrival of the Union Pacific [Railroad]" in 1867.

References

External links 
More photos of Sidney, Nebraska at Wikimedia Commons

Geography of Cheyenne County, Nebraska
Historic districts on the National Register of Historic Places in Nebraska
National Register of Historic Places in Cheyenne County, Nebraska